The Bohemian Spotted Dog (Czech: český strakatý pes, originally Horák's laboratory dog - Horákův laboratorní pes) is a medium-sized dog breed. Originally bred for laboratory purposes by František Horák in Prague in the 1950s, the breed is now primarily a companion dog. This breed is recognized by the Czech Kennel Club but is not FCI recognized.

History
Czech cynologist František Horák wanted to create an ideal dog for laboratory work. He described the desired characteristics in 1954: suitable size, smooth coat, high fertility, good nature and low consumption of food. The first litter of pups was given birth in the same year. Even though the breed was bred primarily for experiments, there is minimal evidence of any experiments on Bohemian spotted dogs at the Physiology Institute where the breeding took place. There are some speculations about successful transplantation of kidney and there is a short note of František Horák about it. There is evidence of tissue transplantations and that the dogs were studied for epilepsy. For many years the existence of the breed remained a secret for the public until 1961 when they were presented on a dog show. In 1981 some of the dogs in the institute were given to breeders. That's when breeders began calling them 'Bohemian spotted dogs'. But despite the promising start, the breed wasn't accepted as well as expected and the dogs were on the edge of extinction. Luckily, few enthusiasts discovered the twisted history of the Bohemian spotted dog and even though there was almost nowhere to start with the rebirth of the breed, they collected 11 dogs all around the Czech Republic. Another litter of pups was born in 1994, which gave the breed new hope.

Temperament
The breed is an excellent companion for inexperienced owners. They have a kind and outgoing temper. They are not aggressive and they don't tend to be dominant because of the original purposes they were bred for. Still, they are good guarding dogs because they tend to bark whenever they hear an intruder even though they won't attack them. They are very friendly towards people and other dogs - they can live in a pack. If trained from a young age they can tolerate other animals, too. They are very active and they are good at sports such as agility and dog dancing. They are known for dog therapy and they are great with little children. They are very playful and have a strong bond with their family. Thanks to their adaptability they are happy to live in an apartment as well.

References

Literature
 

Dog breeds originating in the Czech Republic
Rare dog breeds